Europium(II) titanate is a black mixed oxide of europium and titanium. It crystallizes in the perovskite structure.

History 
EuTiO3 was first examined in 1966 by McGuire, Shafer, Joenk, Halperin and Pickart where the magnetic structure was examined. This compound received more attention at the beginning of the 21st century (2001 to 2015) due to the low-temperature phase transition to antiferromagnetic behavior at TN = 5.5 K, which has a significant influence on the dielectric constant.

Preparation 
Dried Eu2O3 and Ti2O3 are mixed 1:1 and reacted in an argon atmosphere at 1400 °C:

Eu2O3 + Ti2O3 -> 2EuTiO3

The europium is reduced and the titanium is oxidized.

Properties 

Europium(II) titanate has two different crystal forms depending on the temperature. The phase transition occurs at 282 K. The low temperature form crystallizes in the tetragonal space group I4/mcm (space group No. 140) with the lattice parameters a = 551.92(2) pm, c = 781.64(8) pm (measured at 90 K). The higher temperature form has a cubic form with Pmm (space group No. 221) with lattice parameter a = 390.82(2) pm (measured at 300 K).  The transition temperature of the crystal structure from the low-temperature to the high-temperature phase increases with increasing pressure. The compound becomes G-type antiferromagnetic below 5.5 K. The specific heat capacity is 125 J·mol−1·K−1 (at 600 K). 125 J·mol−1·K−1290 K is 7,6 W·m−1·K−1 and the electrical conductivity is 105 (Ω·m)−1(at 330 K).

References 

Europium(II) compounds
Titanates
Titanium compounds